The , also known informally as OpAm, is an art museum and community exhibition venue in Ōita Prefecture, Japan.

The museum is located in the center of the prefectural capital Ōita-shi, a 15-minute walk north-west of Ōita Station.

Current facilities
The museum was opened in April 2015. The new museum building features modern exhibition spaces, artists studios, a café and museum shop. The building was designed by Pritzker Architecture Prize winning architect Shigeru Ban. At the ground level the building features fully retractable glass shutters opening the main internal exhibition space onto an adjacent public plaza.

The building was the recipient of a RIBA International Award for excellence in 2016.

See also 
 Prefectural museum

References

Art museums and galleries in Japan
Shigeru Ban buildings
Art museums established in 2015
2015 establishments in Japan
Ōita (city)
Museums in Ōita Prefecture